Gavin Kaplan (born 7 February 1998) is a South African cricketer. He made his first-class debut on 18 November 2021, for Western Province in the 2021–22 CSA 4-Day Series. He made his Twenty20 debut on 7 February 2022, for Western Province in the 2021–22 CSA T20 Challenge. He made his List A debut on 16 March 2022, for Western Province in the 2021–22 CSA One-Day Cup.

References

External links
 

1998 births
Living people
South African cricketers
Western Province cricketers
Place of birth missing (living people)